Ardrossan Winton Rovers Football Club are a Scottish football club from Ardrossan in North Ayrshire. Formed in 1900 as a Juvenile club before joining the Junior ranks in 1903 they are based at Winton Park and are nicknamed "The Winton". The club colours are Black and White, currently and historically hoops, but all white shirts and black and white stripes have also been used. The change colour is all sky blue. They won the Ayrshire District League in 2014–15 and were promoted to the SJFA Super League First Division for the 2015–16 season. One of their ex-players, Bobby Watson, went on to play professionally for Rangers and later semi-professionally for Fleetwood Town and Blackpool.

Winton Park

Winton Park has been the home of Winton Rovers for most of their existence and was bought from Lord Eglinton in 1923 for £160. The park originally ran in an East West direction, the park was turned to its current North South direction prior to Bells Nursery selling a strip of land to them for £50. The grandstand was built around 1956.

The pitch is approx 110 yards long by 66 wide and the ground capacity is approx 3000. There are four separate areas of covered terracing and the stand seats approximately 100 people.  There are also floodlights but these are not used for matches, except midweek friendlies. On match days there is the opportunity to get refreshments and a regular match programme is also produced.

Honours

See also
:Category:Ardrossan Winton Rovers F.C. players

References

External links
Official website
facebook
twitter

 
Football clubs in Scotland
Scottish Junior Football Association clubs
Football in North Ayrshire
Association football clubs established in 1900
1900 establishments in Scotland
West of Scotland Football League teams
Ardrossan−Saltcoats−Stevenston